Bukowo Morskie  is a village in the administrative district of Gmina Darłowo, within Sławno County, West Pomeranian Voivodeship, in north-western Poland.

The village has a population of 425.

References

Villages in Sławno County